Estrone benzoate, or estrone 3-benzoate, is a synthetic estrogen and estrogen ester – specifically, the C3 benzoate ester of estrone – which was first reported in 1932 and was never marketed. It led to the development in 1933 of the more active estradiol benzoate, the first estradiol ester to be introduced for medical use.

See also
 List of estrogen esters § Estrone esters

References

Abandoned drugs
Benzoate esters
Estrone esters
Ketones
Prodrugs
Synthetic estrogens